Aslan Karatsev was the defending champion but chose not to defend his title.

Franco Agamenone won the title after defeating Ryan Peniston 6–3, 6–1 in the final.

Seeds

Draw

Finals

Top half

Bottom half

References

External links
Main draw
Qualifying draw

IBG Prague Open - 1